L'Infedele was an Italian television talk show hosted by the Italian journalist Gad Lerner and broadcast on La7 from 2002 to 2012.

Telecom Italia Media
Italian television talk shows
Current affairs shows
2002 Italian television series debuts
2000s Italian television series
2010s Italian television series
La7 original programming